Kathy Watanabe is the Council Member for District 1 of the City of Santa Clara. She was appointed to the council on March 7, 2016, by a vote of 4-2 by the then current council members, then won the city council election in November 2016 with 48% of the vote to keep her seat and also won every precinct in the City in an at-large election.  There has been some criticism that the Santa Clara city council remains all white, however she is also the only councilmember representing the Northside of the city. Kathy serves on the Downtown Revitalization Plan, Audit, Facilities Naming and Honorary Recognition Ad Hoc, Police Activities League (PAL) and Santa Clara Sister Cities Association committees.

As part of her council duties, Kathy serves on the following committees: 
Cities Association of Santa Clara County - Board of Directors (Member), Cities Association of Santa Clara County - Legislative Action Committee (Member), City/School Liaison Committee (Santa Clara Unified School District) (Member), Recycling and Waste Reduction Commission of Santa Clara County (RWRC/Vice Chair), San Jose/Santa Clara Treatment Plant Advisory Committee (TPAC/Vice Chair), San Jose/Santa Clara Clean Water Financing Authority (Chair), Santa Clara County Expressway Plan 2040 Policy Advisory Board (PAB).  

On December 19, 2017, the Council unanimously voted for Kathy to serve as Vice Mayor for the City of Santa Clara for 2018.

In June 2018, a judge ordered the City of Santa Clara to district elections and at at-large Mayor.  On November 3, 2020, Kathy was re-elected to the Santa Clara City Council in the District 1 election.

References

Year of birth missing (living people)
Living people
People from Santa Clara, California
California city council members